Frederick Nathaniel Richard (born April 23, 2004) is an American artistic gymnast.  He is the 2021 and 2022 Junior Pan American Champion.

Personal life 
Richard was born on April 23, 2004, in Boston, Massachusetts, to Carl and Ann-Marie Richard. He has two brothers and one sister. He started with gymnastics at age four. During the Covid pandemic he began to post videos on TikTok and gained a following of 360,000.

Gymnastics career

Junior

2019–20 
Richard competed at his first elite-level National Championships in 2019.  He placed eighth in the all-around but won bronze on floor exercise behind Nick Kuebler and Khoi Young.  He was added to the junior national team for the first time. In 2020 Richard competed at the Elite Team Cup and the Winter Cup.  He finished third at the latter behind Fuzzy Benas and Asher Hong. The majority of competitions for the rest of the year were cancelled or postponed due to the global COVID-19 pandemic.

2021 
Richard returned to competition at the 2021 National Championships where he won the junior all-around title. He was named to the team to compete at the upcoming Junior Pan American Championships. While there he helped the United States win gold as a team and individually he won gold in the all-around and on vault and horizontal bar.  Additionally he won silver on floor exercise and bronze on rings.

2022 
Richard became age-eligible to compete at the senior-level in 2022; however he opted to remain at the junior level in international competition.  Richard competed at the DTB Pokal Team Challenge where he helped the United States finish first as a team.  Individually he won gold on vault and parallel bars and placed fifth on floor exercise. Later in the year Richard competed at the Pan American Championships where he once again led the United States to team gold and individually won the all-around competition. During event finals Richard won gold on floor exercise, rings, and vault, silver on parallel bars, and bronze on pommel horse.

Although he competed at the junior level internationally, Richard competed in the senior division in domestic competitions.  He competed on three events at the U.S. Classic before competing in the all-around at the 2022 National Championships.  While there he finished fourth in the all-around, third on floor exercise, and second on horizontal bar.  As a result he was added to the senior national team.

Senior

2023 
Richard began competing for the Michigan Wolverines in the 2022–2023 season.

Competitive history

References

2004 births
Living people
American male artistic gymnasts
Michigan Wolverines men's gymnasts
People from Stoughton, Massachusetts